Joaquín José Morón Hidalgo (16 August 1942 − 30 October 2013) was a Venezuelan Roman Catholic bishop.

Ordained to the priesthood in 1965, Morón Hidalgo was named bishop of the Diocese of Valle la da Pascua in 1992 and then was named bishop of the Diocese of Acarigua–Araure, Venezuela in 2002 and died in October 2013 while still in office.

References

1942 births
2013 deaths
People from Trujillo (state)
Venezuelan Roman Catholic bishops
Roman Catholic bishops of Valle de la Pascua
Roman Catholic bishops of Acarigua–Araure